A Familiar Path is the third chapter of At War With Self, the music project led by multi-instrumentalist and composer Glenn Snelwar. It is a return to Snelwar’s roots as a musician that maintains the concept of the project changing for each release. The original concept in which Snelwar combined classical guitars into progressive and thrash metal has been re-visited and fully realized with A Familiar Path. The new incarnation of At War With Self features Manfred Dikkers, who joins Snelwar again from the Acts of God sessions on drums and percussion. The tracks on A Familiar Path are “the heaviest, most aggressive and accurate version of what I’ve had in mind for combining metal and progressive influences with classical guitars” says Snelwar. Instrumental tracks such as a hybrid half-classical, half-metal rendition of a Heitor Villa-Lobos guitar study, the Slayer-meets-King Crimson aggression of Concrete and Poison and Diseased State, a new rendering of Reflections originally featured on the debut Gordian Knot disc and the guitar shred of The Ether Trail, are balanced with the vocally-centered title track and Ourselves. A Familiar Path is accompanied with artwork that completes the emotion and intensity inspired by the 42 minutes on the disc.

Track listing

Personnel

Band members 

Glenn Snelwar - electric and acoustic guitars, bass, mandolins, keyboards, e-bow, string arrangements, programming, vocals

Guest musicians 

Manfred Dikkers - drums, percussion
Maggie Snelwar – backing vocals

References

External links
Glenn Snelwar's official website
Sluggo's Goon Music

2009 albums
At War with Self albums